Romania participated in the 2010 Summer Youth Olympics in Singapore.

The Romanian squad consisted of 30 athletes competing in 12 sports: aquatics (swimming), athletics, boxing, canoeing, fencing, gymnastics, judo, rowing, shooting, table tennis, tennis and weightlifting.

Medalists

Athletics

Boys
Track and Road Events

Girls
Track and Road Events

Field Events

Boxing

Boys

Canoeing

Boys

Fencing

Group Stage

Knock-Out Stage

Gymnastics

Artistic Gymnastics

Boys

Girls

Judo

Individual

Team

Rowing

Shooting

Pistol

Swimming

Table tennis

Individual

Team

Tennis

Singles

Doubles

Weightlifting

References

External links

Competitors List: Romania

2010 in Romanian sport
Nations at the 2010 Summer Youth Olympics
Romania at the Youth Olympics